Ben May may refer to:
 Ben May (footballer) (born 1984), English semi-professional footballer
 Ben E. May (1889–1972), American businessman and philanthropist
 Ben May (rugby union) (born 1982), New Zealand rugby player
 Ben May (umpire) (born 1982), American baseball umpire
 , a coaster that sank in 1938 off the coast of Scotland

See also
 Benjamin Mays (1894–1984), activist